Restrepiella is a genus of orchid native to Mexico, Colombia, Florida and Central America.

Restrepiella is morphologically similar to Restrepia, but differs in lacking hairlike attachments on a mobile lip and having four pollinia instead of two.

Species
As of June 2014, three species are recognized:

Restrepiella guatemalensis Archila - Guatemala
Restrepiella lueri Pupulin & Bogarín - Costa Rica
Restrepiella ophiocephala (Lindl.) Garay & Dunst. - Mexico, Central America, Colombia, Florida

References

External links

Photos from Belize Botanical Gardens

Pleurothallidinae
Epiphytic orchids
Pleurothallidinae genera
Orchids of Mexico
Orchids of Central America
Orchids of North America